Salvation is the third studio album by Finnish rock band Smack. It was released in 1987.

Track listing
 "The Only Salvation"
 "Set My Love On You"
 "Hellhounds On My Tail"
 "Moonshine Chile"
 "Trust On You"
 "Look Around"
 "Built to Destroy"
 "Blinded by the Light"
 "Johnny the Pusher"
 "Wilderness"

Singles
 "Look Around"
 "The Only Salvation"

Personnel
 Claude – vocals
 Manchuria – guitar
 Rane – guitar
 Jimi Sero – bass
 Kinde – drums

External links 
 Smack

1987 albums
Smack (Finnish band) albums